The Metropolitan Washington Airports Authority (MWAA) is an independent airport authority, created with the consent of the United States Congress to oversee management, operations, and capital development of the two major airports serving the U.S. national capital: Ronald Reagan Washington National Airport and Dulles International Airport.

The Airports Authority was established to operate as a financially self-sustaining entity with the mission to manage and enhance Washington, D.C.'s two-airport system. The authority leases the airports from the United States Department of Transportation. The U.S. government originally built the airports and continues to own the underlying airport property except for property acquired by MWAA subsequent to the lease.

Operations

The daily operation of the airports, their central administration, their police and fire departments and their payroll are not funded by tax dollars. Operating costs are paid through aircraft landing fees, rents for use of terminals and other facilities and revenues from concessions and parking. The Airports Authority is responsible for capital improvements at the airports, which are funded in part by passenger facility charges collected through airline tickets, Federal Airport Improvement Program funds and the proceeds of bonds issued by the Airports Authority.
 

Tolls collected on the Dulles Toll Road are used to operate and improve the Toll Road and fund a portion of the construction of the Metrorail extension project. Additional funding for the Metrorail project is supplied by federal grants and loans and by contributions from the Commonwealth of Virginia, and Loudoun and Fairfax counties in the commonwealth.

BWI Airport is not operated by MWAA, but is owned by the state of Maryland, and operated through the Maryland Aviation Administration, which purchased the then named "Friendship Airport" from the city of Baltimore, in 1972.

History 
The authority was created by the Commonwealth of Virginia (1985 Acts of Assembly, Ch 598, as amended) and the District of Columbia (Regional Airports Authority Act of 1985, as amended). On June 7, 1987, Washington Dulles International Airport and Ronald Reagan Washington National Airport (then known as Washington National Airport) were transferred to MWAA under a 50‑year lease authorized by the U.S. Congress in the Metropolitan Washington Airports Act of 1986, Title VI of Public Law 99‑500, which was signed into law by President Ronald Reagan. Prior to the transfer, the airports were owned and operated by the federal government through the Federal Aviation Administration in the United States Department of Transportation. Under the transfer act, all property owned by the FAA at the airports was transferred to the new Authority, with the Federal government retaining title to the lease. The original 50‑year lease has been extended to 80 years, expiring in June 2067.

On February 6, 1998, President Bill Clinton signed into law an act passed by Congress which officially changed the name of Washington National Airport to Ronald Reagan Washington National Airport.

Governance
The authority is governed by a 17-member board of directors with seven members appointed by the Governor of Virginia, four by the Mayor of the District of Columbia, three by the Governor of Maryland, and three by the President of the United States. Leading the management of the authority is president and chief executive officer, John E. Potter. Potter's tenure began on July 18, 2011 after a nationwide search was conducted for a permanent president and CEO. Three people served as CEO prior to Potter: James Wilding, James Bennett and Lynn Hampton. Each airport operated by MWAA is under the direction of a vice president and airport manager.

Airport highways: the Dulles Access and Toll roads
MWAA's lease encompasses the Dulles Access Road's right-of-way. The Dulles Airport Access Road serves traffic to and from Dulles Airport only. Since 2008, MWAA has had ownership of the Dulles Toll Road, the outer lanes of the right-of-way which were built by the Virginia Department of Transportation, and the usage of which is subject to a toll. However, the inner lanes, which comprise the aforementioned Dulles Access Road, are free of charge for drivers going directly between Dulles Airport and the surrounding area.

Dulles Corridor Metrorail Silver Line Project

MWAA constructed a Silver Line extension of the D.C. Metrorail system, which completed the long-awaited rail link between downtown Washington, Tysons, Reston, Dulles Airport, and eastern Loudoun County. Phase 1, which was completed in 2014, extended the Metrorail system to Reston, Virginia. Phase 2 included the construction of the rail infrastructure, stations, pedestrian bridges to the stations, systems, and entrance pavilions, as well as the aerial tracks at Dulles Airport. The project was completed in November 2022.

Police and fire 

The Metropolitan Washington Airports Authority has its own, full-service, state (Virginia) accredited police department which patrols airport properties and grounds, including the Dulles Airport Access Highway, the Dulles Toll Road and the area 300 yards surrounding the airports. The Virginia State Police, and Fairfax County Police also exercise police power over the airport property within their respective jurisdiction including the Dulles Airport Access Highway and the Dulles Toll Road. Virginia law also grants concurrent jurisdiction to the Arlington County Police for Reagan National Airport.

The authority also has a full-service Fire and Rescue Department that operates at both Dulles and National Airports. The authority's Fire and Rescue Department provides a wide range of services to the airports including aircraft rescue firefighting in accordance with the standards of the Federal Aviation Administration, structural firefighting, emergency medical services (basic and advanced life support) and river rescue (at National Airport). The authority's Fire & Rescue Department will also provide mutual-aid services to the surrounding jurisdictions, as needed, under a Memorandum of Understanding signed by several jurisdictions in Northern Virginia. As an example, firefighters from National Airport were among the first responders to the Pentagon following the crash of American Airlines Flight 77 on September 11, 2001.

References

External links
 
 MWAA on Twitter
 Fly Reagan.com 
 Fly Dulles.com
 Dulles Toll Road.com
 Silver Line Metro.com